was a Japanese photographer.

References

Japanese photographers
1908 births
1978 deaths